The 1970 Connecticut Huskies football team represented the University of Connecticut in the 1970 NCAA College Division football season.  The Huskies were led by fifth-year head coach John Toner, and completed the season with a record of 4–4–1.

Schedule

References

Connecticut
UConn Huskies football seasons
Yankee Conference football champion seasons
Connecticut Huskies football